The 2014 Biathlon Junior World Championships was held in Presque Isle, United States from February 26 to March 7, 2014. There was to be a total of 16 competitions: sprint, pursuit, individual, mass start, and relay races for men and women.

Medal winners

Youth Women

Junior Women

Youth Men

Junior Men

Medal table

References

External links
Official IBU website 

Biathlon Junior World Championships
2014 in biathlon
2014 in American sports
International sports competitions hosted by the United States
2014 in youth sport
Multisports in the United States